Flimby is an English coastal village and former civil parish in the Allerdale district in Cumbria. It was historically in Cumberland. It currently forms part of the parish of Maryport and the Flimby ward of Allerdale Council. It is included in the Maryport South county division of Cumbria County Council. In 1951 the parish had a population of 2066.

Governance
The village is in the parliamentary constituency of Workington. In the December 2019 general election, the Tory candidate for Workington, Mark Jenkinson, overturned a 9.4 per cent Labour majority from the 2017 election to eject shadow environment secretary Sue Hayman by a margin of 4,136 votes. Until the December 2019 general election the Labour Party had won the seat in the constituency in every general election since 1979. The Conservative Party had previously only been elected once in Workington since World War II, at the 1976 by-election. Flimby historically has been a Labour-supporting area.

On 1 April 1974 the parish was abolished and merged with Maryport.

Geography and flooding
Flimby is located on Cumbria's coast between the towns of Maryport to the north and Workington to the south.

It is drained by streams from nearby hillsides, some of which pass under the village in culverts. These have caused period flooding. However, woody debris dams, as a form of natural flood management, have been built in the Penny Gill forest by the West Cumbria Rivers Trust, as a way of storing water temporarily upstream and reducing what the culverts need to carry.

Amenities
Flimby railway station on the Cumbrian Coast Line has served the village since 1846. Trains stop only by request. The village is also served by regular buses between Maryport, Workington and beyond.

The Anglican church of St Nicholas is in the Diocese of Carlisle. It holds services on the second and fourth Sundays of the month. The site of the successive former Flimby Methodist churches in West Lane (built in 1862 and about 1929) is now occupied by a house.

The village has a primary school with about 150 pupils. There is a convenience store and also a working men's social club.

Flimby's amateur rugby league club, the Vikings, plays in the Iggesund Cumberland League.

The shoe manufacturer New Balance has a factory on the outskirts of the village. Flimby Wind Farm opened in June 2013.

Heritage
The name of the village was recorded as Flinbi in 1056  and Flemyngeby in the 12th century, and seems to come from Old Norse Flæminga bý, meaning "the village of the Flemings".

Flimby has three Grade II historic buildings listed by English Heritage. Flimby Cottage in Main Road is an early 19th-century pebble dash lodge in Gothic Revival style. Flimby Hall is a three-storey country house completed in 1766. Flimby Lodge is a mansion dating from the late 18th or early 19th century, derelict at the time it was listed in 1977.

Notable people
The Scottish novelist and poet Helen Craik lived at Flimby Hall from 1792 until her death in 1825 and has a memorial in the parish church.
Dick Huddart (1936–2021), a professional rugby league player, was born in Flimby.
The birth of John McKeown, the professional rugby league international, was registered in Flimby in 1926.

See also

Listed buildings in Maryport
Flimby railway station

References

External links

Cumbria County History Trust: Flimby (nb: provisional research only - see Talk page)

Villages in Cumbria
Former civil parishes in Cumbria
Maryport